Saint Lazaros of Mount Galesios (Lazaros ho Galēsiōtēs;  – 7 November 1053) was an 11th-century Byzantine monk and stylite, who founded a monastic community at Mount Galesios near Ephesus.

Life
Lazaros was born near Magnesia to a peasant family, and his original name was Leo (Λέων).

After finishing his elementary schooling, he left his home and went to Attaleia to become a monk. Later he went to the famed Lavra of Saint Sabas in Palestine, before returning to his home region. He founded three monasteries at Mount Galesios near Ephesus, while he himself became a stylite and lived in a pillar. The monks in the monastic communities Lazaros founded lived in individual cells, rather than the cenobitic monasticism of most monasteries; they were even allowed to earn their own income through practicing a handicraft.

According to a vita of Lazaros of Mount Galesios written by his disciple Gregory the Cellarer, Lazaros climbed and descended Mount Argeas (now more commonly known as Mount Erciyes) in the depths of winter while singing the Psalms, as he encountered harsh weather and even a bear and attacking dogs.

Hagiography
Lazaros's hagiography was written by his disciple, the kellarite Gregory; and reworked by the Patriarch of Constantinople, Gregory II of Cyprus, in the late 13th century. According to the description of Alexander Kazhdan, the hagiography "has few supernatural miracles but many vignettes rich in everyday details: the young Lazaros escaped sexual seduction in the house of a girl whom he accompanied to Chonae; Lazaros's corpse, with the help of the monk Cyril, signed the diatyposis for the monks; many thefts and quarrels, travels, and visits are described. Gregory focuses on local events, while Constantinople is depicted as a remote city teeming with danger".

References

Sources
 
 
 
 

10th-century births
1053 deaths
11th-century Byzantine monks
Year of birth uncertain
Byzantine saints of the Eastern Orthodox Church
Stylites
People from Manisa
Founders of Christian monasteries